This Is It may refer to:

Literature
 This Is It (novel), a 1996 novel by Joseph Connolly
 This Is It, a 1956 novel by Hal Ellson

Music

Albums
 Michael Jackson's This Is It (album) or the title song (see below), 2009
 This Is It (concert residency), a 2009–2010 planned series of concerts
 Michael Jackson's This Is It, a 2009 film documenting Jackson's rehearsals for the concerts
 This Is It (Jack Ingram album), 2007
 This Is It (Jimmy Ibbotson album), 1999
 This Is It (Melba Moore album) or the title song (see below), 1976
 This Is It: The Best of Faith No More, 2003
 This Is It: The Very Best Of, by Dannii Minogue, 2013
 This Is It! (The A&M Years 1979–1989), by Joe Jackson, 1997
 This Is It!, by Betty Davis, 2005
 This Is It, by Bride, 2003
 This Is It, by Six, 2002

Songs
 "This Is It" (Kenny Loggins song), 1979
 "This Is It" (Jim Reeves song), 1965
 "This Is It" (Melba Moore song), 1976; covered by Dannii Minogue, 1993
 "This Is It" (Michael Jackson song), 2009
 "This Is It", an unreleased song recorded by Michael Jackson, unrelated to the above, 1984
 "This Is It" (Ryan Adams song), 2004
 "This Is It" (Scotty McCreey song), 2018
 "This Is It" (Staind song), 2009
 "This Is It", by Billy Preston from That's the Way God Planned It, 1969
 "This Is It", by Innosense from So Together, 2000
 "This Is It", by Jay and the Americans, 1962
 "This Is It", by Lo Moon from Lo Moon, 2018

Television
 This Is It (TV series), a 2016–2017 Nigerian drama series
 This Is It, a 1960s Australian variety program on ATV
 "This Is It", the theme song of The Bugs Bunny Show
 "This Is It", the theme song of the 1970s American sitcom One Day at a Time
 "This Is It" (One Day at a Time episode), the first episode of the 2017 One Day at a Time remake

Other
 This Is It! (bar), the oldest continually operating gay bar in Wisconsin, US
 This Is It Collective, a group of filmmakers best known for creating the Don't Hug Me I'm Scared series

See also
 Diz Iz It!, a 2010 Philippine variety show
 This Is It and I Am It and You Are It and So Is That and He Is It and She Is It and It Is It and That Is That, a 2008 album by Marnie Stern
Zehu Ze! (lit. This Is it!), an Israeli television series, 1978–1998